The Buru Quartet or Buru Tetralogy is a literary tetralogy written by Indonesian author Pramoedya Ananta Toer at Buru Island detention camp in Maluku. It is composed of the novels This Earth of Mankind, Child of All Nations, Footsteps, and House of Glass, published between 1980 and 1988. The book series is loosely based on the life of Tirto Adhi Soerjo.

The Buru Quartet books were banned by the regime of long-serving Indonesian president Suharto and his successor B.J. Habibie. The ban was lifted in 2000.

References

External links
Buru Quartet review by the Asian Review of Books

1980s novels
Historical novels
Novels by Pramoedya Ananta Toer
Censored books
Novel series
Literary tetralogies
Buru